Siamak Yasemi (June 1925 – 31 May 1994) was an Iranian director, screenwriter, producer, and poet. He was the son of Rashid Yasemi. He is known for revolutionizing the cinematic industry in Iran and is considered one of the most successful film makers in Iran.

Filmography
1970 Leyli and Majnoon
1968 Bar asman neyeshte
1968 Tange ejdeha
1966 Shamsi pahlevoon
1965 Croesus' Treasure (Ganje Gharoon)
1965 The Champion of Champions
1964 The Pleasures of Sin
1964 Mr. Twentieth Century
1964 The Seven Month Genius
1963 The Shores of Anticipation
1963 Horror
1962 Incorrigible
1961 The Bum
1961 Uncle No-Ruz
1960 The Strong Man
1960 The Spring of Life
1958 Broken Spell
1958 Naughty But Sweet
1955 The Bandit
1953 The Nights of Tehran

External links

 

1925 births
1994 deaths
Iranian film directors
Iranian screenwriters
Iranian film producers
Iranian male poets
Kurdish film directors
People from Kermanshah
Iranian Kurdish people
Iranian Yarsanis
20th-century Iranian poets
20th-century male writers
20th-century screenwriters